XMX (or just X) Channel 2 was a commercial-free, satellite radio station on Sirius XM Radio, formerly XM Satellite Radio. Originally used to remind subscribers of overdue payments, the channel changed to a music format on August 1, 2007 and featured popular exclusive XM music programming played all day, every day. XMX was discontinued on November 12, 2008, as part of the merger of the SIRIUS and XM channel lineups.  The channel was directed by Paul Bachmann, who was also regularly found in XM's Classical and Rock neighborhoods in the 2000s.

Programming lineup
Mondays: Artist Confidential
Tuesdays: Bill Anderson Visits with the Legend
Wednesdays: Theme Time Radio Hour with Bob Dylan
Thursdays: Tom Petty's Buried Treasure
Fridays: XM All-Stars - Variety of XM's mini-series
Weekends: Studio 2 - Various XM homegrown shows and specials

List of live special events and rebroadcasts
Concert For Diana: The concert was rebroadcast on Friday, 2007-08-31
Live Earth: The entire concert was rebroadcast Saturday, 2007-09-01 through Sunday, 2007-09-02
Farm Aid 2007: A Homegrown Festival: The event was broadcast live Sunday, 2007-09-09, and was exclusive to the channel on XM
2008 Bonnaroo Music Festival: Music and interviews from the event were broadcast June 13–15, 2008.

See also
XM Satellite Radio channel history

XMX
Radio stations established in 2007
Radio stations disestablished in 2008